Ray Higgs (born 1950) is an Australian former rugby league footballer who played in the 1970s. An Australian international and Queensland representative forward, he played club football in the NSWRFL Premiership with Sydney's Parramatta Eels for three seasons between 1975-1977 and Manly-Warringah Sea Eagles for one season 1978.

Playing career
Originally from Roma, Queensland, Higgs played for Nambour Crushers and Souths Magpies. He was selected to represent Queensland and then made his debut for the Australian national side in 1974. The following year he helped the Kangaroos to victory in the 1975 World Cup. After winning both the Rothmans Medal and the Rugby League Week player of the year award in 1976, he captained his club, the Parramatta Eels, to that year's and 1977's Grand Finals. Higgs continued representing Australia, featuring in The Kangaroos' triumph in the 1977 World Cup. Higgs is listed on the Australian Players Register as Kangaroo No. 478. He played a total of nine Tests for Australia between 1974-1977.

After only four seasons in the NSWRFL, Ray Higgs returned to Queensland in 1979.

Accolades
In 2011, Higgs was inducted into the Parramatta Eels hall of fame.

References

External links

1950 births
Living people
Australian rugby league players
Australia national rugby league team players
City New South Wales rugby league team players
New South Wales rugby league team players
Parramatta Eels players
People from Roma, Queensland
Queensland rugby league team players
Rugby league players from Queensland
Souths Logan Magpies players

Manly Warringah Sea Eagles players

Rugby league second-rows
Date of birth missing (living people)